John Bennett Gillingham (born 3 August 1940) is Emeritus Professor of Medieval History at the London School of Economics and Political Science. On 19 July 2007 he was elected a Fellow of the British Academy.

Gillingham is renowned as an expert on the Angevin Empire.

Books
Books by Gillingham:
 Richard the Lionheart (Weidenfeld and Nicolson, 1978)
 The Wars of the Roses: peace and conflict in fifteenth-century England (Weidenfeld and Nicolson, 1981)
 The Angevin Empire (E. Arnold, 1984)
 Richard Coeur de Lion: kingship, chivalry and war in the twelfth century (Hambledon Press, 1994)
 Richard I (Yale University Press, 1999) Part of the Yale English Monarchs Series
 The English in the Twelfth Century: imperialism, national identity, and political values (Boydell and Brewer, 2000)

References

Living people
Fellows of the British Academy
People educated at Brighton, Hove and Sussex Grammar School
1940 births